Merete Morken Andersen (born 24 July 1965) is a Norwegian novelist, children's writer and magazine editor, born in Hamar. Andersen won the prestigious Norwegian Critics Prize for Literature in 2002 for Hav av tid (Oceans of Time). She was editor of the literature periodical Vinduet (Window) from 1993 through 1997. Several of her books have been translated into English

Bibliography 
 Fra – Novel ( 1988 ) 
 Broren min løper – Novel ( 1991 ) 
 Ibsenhåndboken – om Henrik Ibsens dramatikk – a handbook on Henrik Ibsen's drama (1995)
 Dronningen etter badet – Novel ( 1996 ) 
 Fiendens musikk – poetry ( 1997 ) 
 Livsritualer – om Cecilie Løveids – Drama ( 1998 ) Livsritualer 
 Hav av tid – Novel, translated into English as Oceans of Time (2002)
 Agnes & Molly (2008)

Prizes
  Norwegian Critics Prize for Literature  2002 for Hav av tid
 Amalie Skram-prisen 2003

References 

1965 births
Living people
Norwegian children's writers
20th-century Norwegian novelists
21st-century Norwegian novelists
Norwegian Critics Prize for Literature winners
Norwegian women novelists
Norwegian women children's writers
21st-century Norwegian women writers
20th-century Norwegian women writers
People from Hamar